Cameron Scott Friesen, MLA is a Canadian politician and was a member of the Legislative Assembly of Manitoba for Morden-Winkler. A member of the Progressive Conservative Party of Manitoba, he was first elected in the 2011 provincial election, and re-elected in 2016 and 2019.

Friesen was the Manitoba Minister of Finance from May 3, 2016 until August 1, 2018 and served a second term from January 18, 2022 until January 30, 2023  He was appointed Minister of Health, Seniors and Active Living on August 1, 2018. During his tenure as Minister of Health, Seniors and Active Living, Friesen has faced several criticisms for his handling of the COVID-19 pandemic. He was appointed Minister of Justice and Attorney General on January 5, 2021.

Friesen announced his resignation as Minister of Finance in January 2023, and shortly thereafter on February 3, 2023 he resigned his seat as MLA for Morden-Winkler to seek the federal nomination in Portage—Lisgar after Candice Bergen announced the previous fall that she would not be seeking reelection in the 45th Canadian federal election.

Health minister
In November 2020 he questioned the motivation of more than 200 experts who raised concerns regarding the seriousness of COVID-19. At the time, he claimed he had things under control. After he refused to apologize, opposition MLAs including New Democratic Party health critic Uzoma Asagwara and Liberal Party leader Dougald Lamont called on him to resign.

Electoral record

References

External links
Cameron Friesen

Living people
Finance ministers of Manitoba
Members of the Executive Council of Manitoba
People from Morden, Manitoba
Progressive Conservative Party of Manitoba MLAs
Year of birth missing (living people)
21st-century Canadian politicians
Canadian Mennonites
University of British Columbia alumni
University of Manitoba alumni
University of Winnipeg alumni